Brett P. Jodie (born March 25, 1977) is a former Major League Baseball (MLB) pitcher. He batted and threw right-handed. He is the current manager for the Lincoln Saltdogs of the American Association of Professional Baseball.

Career
Jodie attended the University of South Carolina. He was drafted by the Yankees in the 6th round of the 1998 Major League Baseball Draft. He had a 0–2 record, with a 6.39 earned run average (ERA) in eight games for the two teams.

He returned to the Yankees organization following the 2001 season, remaining in their minor league system until 2002. In 2003 and in 2005, Jodie pitched for the Somerset Patriots of the independent Atlantic League before retiring in 2006.

Jodie was the pitching coach for the Somerset Patriots and was named manager on November 27, 2012, replacing Sparky Lyle. Jodie managed the team through the 2019 season, winning a championship in 2015. He was not retained as manager following the Patriots' promotion to Minor League Baseball for the 2021 season and beyond.

On April 7, 2021, Jodie was announced as new manager for the Lincoln Saltdogs of the American Association of Professional Baseball.

References

External links

1977 births
Living people
Major League Baseball pitchers
Baseball players from South Carolina
New York Yankees players
San Diego Padres players
Oneonta Yankees players
Greensboro Bats players
Tampa Yankees players
Norwich Navigators players
Columbus Clippers players
Portland Beavers players
Somerset Patriots players
Minor league baseball managers